Kommissar X – Drei goldene Schlangen  (translation: Commissioner X: Three Golden Snakes) is a 1969 international co-production Eurospy film directed by Roberto Mauri and starring Tony Kendall and Brad Harris that was shot in Thailand. It is the sixth of seven films, loosely based on the Kommissar X detective novels from the Pabel Moewig publishing house.

Plot
While sightseeing in Bangkok, Phyllis Leighton, a young American girl is kidnapped by white slavers.  Her mother approaches New York Police Captain Tom Rowland who is attending a conference In Bangkok.  With little for the police to go on, Phyllis's frantic mother Maud telephones private eye Joe Walker in New York to come to Bangkok to find her daughter.

Phyllis finds herself on an island with other kidnapped women who are being forced into prostitution. Soon after Joe Walker's arrival both he and Tom are subject to a multitude of assassination attempts by flame thrower, blowgun and poison gas.  Their only clue is that each of the dead unsuccessful assassins have a tattoo of three golden serpents.

Cast
Tony Kendall as Joe Walker / Kommissar X
Brad Harris as Captain Tom Rowland
Hansi Linder as Phyllis Leighton
Walter Brandi as Landru
Monica Pardo as Kathin Russell
Loni Heuser as  Maud Leighton
Vilaiwan Vatanapanich as Madame Kim Soh
Herbert Fux as Killer #1
Giuseppe Mattei as Killer #2

Release
Kommissar X – Drei goldene Schlangen was released on 18 April 1969.

References

External links

1969 films
West German films
1960s Italian-language films
1960s German-language films
German spy thriller films
1960s buddy films
Films set in Bangkok
Films shot in Thailand
Films based on German novels
Italian spy thriller films
Films about prostitution in Thailand
1960s multilingual films
German multilingual films
Italian multilingual films
1960s Italian films
1960s German films